Morchella australiana is a species of ascomycete fungus in the family Morchellaceae. Described as new to science in 2014, it is found in New South Wales, Tasmania and Victoria, Australia. The type locality was in the temperate Pilliga Scrub of northwestern New South Wales, west of the Great Dividing Range. Fruit bodies of the fungus resemble those of the European Morchella elata, but molecular and morphological analyses demonstrated that the Australian species represents a unique lineage.

References

External links

Edible fungi
Fungi described in 2014
Fungi of Australia
australiana
Taxa named by James Trappe